Ramagundam railway station (station code: RDM) Ramagundam railway station is the busiest station in Kazipet–Balharshah section of Secunderabad division, and it is located in Peddapalli district of Telangana. The station is well connected by rail to all parts of India. Ninety-seven trains arrive at, or depart from, the station daily, transporting over 18,000 passengers daily to their destinations across the country, and also serves Ramagundam, Godavarikhani  areas. It is under the jurisdiction of Secunderabad railway division of South Central Railway.

History 
With the completion of the Kazipet–Balharshah link in 1929, Chennai was directly linked to Delhi. Mainly this station surroundings has urban population passengers crowd is huge to this station with surrounding towns are Godavarikhani, Manthani, and Peddapalli. It is known as the "Grand Trunk Line". Mostly this station have maximum train halts passing through this main line.

Electrification 
The Balharshah–Ramagundam sector in 1987–88 was electrified. This station is famous for MGR (Merry go round) system i.e., goods or coal carriage trains continuously runs and overhauls at this station and it has a coach maintenance depot [RDM].

Developments 
A new  railway line has been approved by the Cabinet Committee on Economic Affairs between Balharshah and Kazipet on August 26, 2016. The new line is extremely useful from goods loading point of view with FCI at Jammikunta, Kesoram Cement at Raghavapuram, Thermal Power Stations and SCCL at Ramagundam in Telangana, and Cement Chandrapur in Maharashtra. This will facilitate both the passenger traffic and goods movement that include cement, coal and food.

Survey for new route from Manuguru to Ramagundam is completed but waiting for budget allocation from central government.

References

External links 

Railway stations in Karimnagar district